"Walkin' on My Mind" was a hit for soul singer Dianne Brooks. Released in 1969, it was the first single released by Revolver Records. It was also Brooks' first release on a Canadian owned label. It is also an example of how the quality of a song can activate a record label.

Background
"Walkin' on My Mind" bw "Need to Belong" was a Mort Ross production. It was released in February, 1969 on the Revolution Records' subsidiary, Revolver.  It was also released as "Walking On My Mind" in the United States on Ray Charles' Tangerine label, cat no. TRC 993.

The song started off in 1969 as one of two demos at a newly built recording studio that was set to open for business later that year in August. It wasn't the intention of the studio owners to start off with a record company. Mort Ross, Doug Riley and their engineer, Englishman, Terry Brown wanted to build a studio with recording facilities superior to what was in Canada at the time. However Dianne Brooks' vocal work on the two Doug Riley compositions changed things. The songs were deemed to be too good to remain unreleased. As a result of this Revolver Records came into being.

Distribution
For Canadian distribution in Canada, the Compo Company was chosen. Revolution's chief, Mort Ross had travelled to New York to set up the distribution deal with Ray Charles'  Tangerine label for the current record. The deal also involved any future releases from Brooks. For English distribution Morgan Records was chosen.

The record was released in New Zealand on the Viking record label.

Chart performance
By April 21, 1969, the song had entered the RPM Weekly Canadian Content Chart at #10. 
By May 2, it reached #4 on the RPM chart. It got to #67 nationally.

Releases

References

1969 songs
1969 singles
Tangerine Records (1962) singles
Revolver Records singles